Oktyabrskoye is a rural locality (a selo) in Kovrizhsky Selsoviet of Konstantinovsky District, Amur Oblast, Russia. The population was 101 as of 2018. There are 2 streets.

Geography 
Oktyabrskoye is located 16 km northwest of Konstantinovka (the district's administrative centre) by road. Kovrizhka is the nearest rural locality.

References 

Rural localities in Konstantinovsky District